The second season of the American dramedy-mystery television series Desperate Housewives commenced airing in the United States on September 25, 2005, and concluded on May 21, 2006. The season continues the story of the Wisteria Lane residents, while their seemingly perfect lives in the suburban neighborhood are shaken by the arrival of the mysterious Betty Applewhite. Broadcast in the Sunday night time slot at 9.00 ET, the season aired twenty-four regular episodes, including a two-part season finale. In addition, three clip shows were produced for the season, in order to put the previous events of the show in perspective. "All the Juicy Details" aired before the eleventh episode, detailing the most memorable events of the season's first half, whereas "The More You Know, The Juicier It Gets", which aired before the twentieth episode, prepared the viewers for the highly anticipated season finale. "Time to Come Clean" aired three weeks before the inception of the third season, and reviewed the previous mysteries of the series before introducing the new story lines. The second season had fourteen roles receiving star billing, out of whom eleven were part of the first season's main cast. The main story lines of the season were Susan Mayer's relationship with her former husband, Gabrielle Solis' upcoming motherhood, Lynette Scavo's return to work and the death of Bree Van de Kamp's husband.

The season received mixed reviews from television critics, noting Marc Cherry's lack of involvement in the production as one of the main reasons for the series' decreasing quality. Cherry has since said that he regrets most of the second season and that ABC's decision to order an additional episode for the season forced the series to work on an abbreviated schedule. However, the main cast members, as well as the guest stars, received critical acclaim, resulting in numerous awards and nominations. The highest-rated episode of the season was the season premiere, watched by 28.36 million viewers, with a 10.1 rating, being the series' second highest-rated episode to date. Buena Vista Home Entertainment officially released the season on DVD in the United States and Canada on August 29, 2006.

Production

Marc Cherry, Tom Spezialy, and Michael Edelstein returned as executive producers for the second season of the series. Screenwriter Kevin Murphy also returned to the series, this season as a co-executive producer alongside George W. Perkins, Chris Black, Joey Murphy and John Pardee. All but Edelstein and Pardee also served as writers. Season one writers Alexandra Cunningham, Jenna Bans, Kevin Etten, and Josh Senter were joined by new series writers Bruce Zimmerman, Dahvi Waller, Alan Cross, Ellie Herman, Jim Lincoln, and Scott Sanford Tobis. Bans and Senter also became story editors. Nine directors serviced Desperate Housewives, including season one directors Larry Shaw, David Grossman and Arlene Sanford. Wendey Stanzler, Robert Duncan McNeill, Pam Thomas, Randy Zisk, Stephen Cragg, and Tom Cherones directed episodes of the series for the first time during this season. Cherry left a majority of the season's writing to other staff members, which many critics faulted as the reason for the decreasing quality of the series. Edelstein left the series after the first thirteen episodes of the season, and Spezialy followed in May 2006. Cherry has since said that he regrets most of the second season and that ABC's decision to order an additional episode for the season forced the series to work on an abbreviated schedule. Cast member Teri Hatcher has also mentioned production problems during filming for the series' second season, including incomplete or delayed scripts, whereas fellow cast members Marcia Cross, James Denton, and Felicity Huffman have all expressed concerns of the series' declining quality both with the writing staff and the press. Colonial Street, which is the location of Wisteria Lane set for the series, went through additional changes prior to production on the second season. The cul-de-sac, known as "Circle Drive" by crew members, was heavily remodeled. Previously unseen in first season, "Circle Drive" contained a church facade, which was replaced by Edie Britt's second home, and the Colonial Mansion building, which was destroyed and replaced with a park for the series.

While developing storylines for the second season, series creator Marc Cherry stated, "I want to keep finding new ways to talk about issues that relate to everyday women," explaining that the show needs to focus on "small, real, everyday issues" in order to keep the audience interested. Cherry cited the Lynette storyline as an example of this strategy: "Lynette will be returning to her advertising roots next season, so I want to address how difficult it is to go to work all day and then come home and be expected to also take care of your house." Huffman recognized that her character's storylines needed a change of pace, but hoped that Lynette's domestic life would still play an integral role this season. "My hope is to not get lost in the corporate world; that it's still a home and family/husband and children story," she explained. "But how many times can you go, 'Kids, clear your plates!'" The season premiere introduced Lynette's new boss, Nina Fletcher, portrayed by Joely Fisher who describes her character as "nasty", elaborating: "Lynette suddenly has to come up against this tiger lady who never stops reminding Lynette that she's childless by choice. Even though Nina is not a housewife, she is desperate in her own way." Due to the death of his character, Steven Culp did not return to the series for the second season, but provided his face for the open casket scene in the season premiere, which saw the producers create a life mask of the actor. Doug Savant was promoted to series regular after appearing as a recurring guest star throughout the first season.

The season saw the promotion of Alfre Woodard and Mehcad Brooks to series regulars,  after they were introduced in the final two episodes of the first season. Woodard played Betty Applewhite, a "deeply religious, overbearing single mother" while Mehcad portrayed her son, Matthew. In regards to the characters and their mystery storyline, Cherry stated: "They come on the street; they seem like nice people — but they've got a secret. And it's pretty gothic. It's real and human and awful all at the same time." Woodard commented that her character "never means harm... Let's just say she has flaws. She had to make some really tough decisions quick and if the law ever catches up with her, she'll have to serve time... But they'll never catch her." The final scene in which Betty and Matthew bring food to the prisoner in their basement was originally intended for the first-season finale but saved for "Next" instead. While the Applewhites are regarded as the first major black characters on the series, Cherry stated that the role of Betty was originally offered to two white film actresses, both of whom turned it down due to financial and time commitment issues. He clarified: "There's nothing strategically black about her character. Her color is incidental." Woodard stated that she had never seen the show before accepting the role, something that led the producers to send her fifteen episodes of the show, which she divided amongst various family members. After they compared storylines, Woodard recalled that she became "instantly hooked" on the series. Woodard reported experiencing heavy media attention after accepting the role. Both Brooks and his brother, Billy, auditioned for the role of Matthew. The final decision came down to both brothers as well as two other actors. According to Cherry, Brooks was cast because he exuded a "dangerous" element, as well as "a combination of this wholesome, sweet quality and a dark, brooding quality."

Cast

Regular

Starring
Teri Hatcher as Susan Mayer 
Felicity Huffman as Lynette Scavo 
Marcia Cross as Bree Van de Kamp
Eva Longoria as Gabrielle Solis 
Nicollette Sheridan as Edie Britt
Alfre Woodard as Betty Applewhite
Ricardo Antonio Chavira as Carlos Solis 
Mark Moses as Paul Young
Andrea Bowen as Julie Mayer 
Doug Savant as Tom Scavo
Cody Kasch as Zach Young
Richard Burgi as Karl Mayer
Brenda Strong as Mary Alice Young
and James Denton as Mike Delfino

Also starring
Shawn Pyfrom as Andrew Van de Kamp
Joy Lauren as Danielle Van de Kamp
Mehcad Brooks as Matthew Applewhite 
Brent Kinsman as Preston Scavo 
Shane Kinsman as Porter Scavo 
Zane Huett as Parker Scavo 
Page Kennedy as Caleb Applewhite
NaShawn Kearse as Caleb Applewhite
Roger Bart as George Williams

Supporting

Recurring
Currie Graham as Ed Ferrara 
Harriet Sansom Harris as Felicia Tilman
Jay Harrington as Dr. Ron McCready 
Gwendoline Yeo as Xiao-Mei 
Ryan Carnes as Justin
Kathryn Joosten as Karen McCluskey
Charlie Babcock as Stu Durber
Pat Crawford Brown as Ida Greenberg
Joely Fisher as Nina Fletcher
Kurt Fuller as Detective Barton 
Bob Gunton as Noah Taylor 
Alejandro Patino as Ralph 
Lee Tergesen as Peter McMillan 
Kyle MacLachlan as Orson Hodge
Jill Brennan as Tish Atherton 
Nick Chinlund as Detective Sullivan 
Jeff Doucette as Father Crowley 
Shirley Knight as Phyllis Van de Kamp 
Sam Lloyd as Dr. Albert Goldfine 
Jesse Metcalfe as John Rowland 
Betty Murphy as Alberta Fromme

Guest
Steven Culp as Rex Van de Kamp 
Kiersten Warren as Nora Huntington
Lesley Ann Warren as Sophie Bremmer
Terry Bozeman as Dr. Lee Craig 
Maria Cominis as Mona Clarke
Alec Mapa as Vern 
Dakin Matthews as Reverend Sikes

The second season had fourteen roles receiving star billing, out of whom eleven were part of the first season's main cast. The season sees the promotion of three former guest stars, who begin acting as series regulars from the season's first episode. The series is narrated by Brenda Strong, from the point of view of the deceased Mary Alice Young, as she observes, from a unique perspective, the lives of the Wisteria Lane residents and her former best friends. Susan Mayer, portrayed by Teri Hatcher, is divorcée and single mother, who, in her continuous search for a romantic commitment, ends up in bed with her former husband. Felicity Huffman portrayed Lynette Scavo, who starts neglecting her responsibilities as a mother, after the realization of her undeniable talent for advertising results in her going back to work after a six-year absence. Marcia Cross portrayed Bree Van de Kamp, whose flawless life is shaken after she starts dealing with the aftermath of her husband's death, while trying to overcome her guilt for having dated the man who killed him. Former model Gabrielle Solis, portrayed by Eva Longoria, who suffers a miscarriage just as she starts accepting upcoming motherhood. Nicollette Sheridan portrayed Edie Britt, whose commitment issues and numerous one night stands have made her an iconic character.

Ricardo Antonio Chavira played Gabrielle's husband, Carlos Solis, who has to cope with the revelation of his wife's affair with their gardener, while trying to get out of jail. Mark Moses continues his role of widower Paul Young, who tries to cover up the murder of his adoptive son's biological mother. Zach Young, portrayed by Cody Kasch, finally learns about his true identity, but refuses to be a part of his father's life, whereas Julie Mayer, Susan's daughter portrayed by Andrea Bowen, deals with her parents' unexpected reconciliation. James Denton portrayed Mike Delfino, who has to deal with both his break-up with Susan Mayer, and his recently discovered biological son. Previously a recurring character throughout the last episodes of the previous season, Betty Applewhite, portrayed by Alfre Woodard, was conceived as a new resident of Wisteria Lane, whose mysterious arc is the season's main storyline. Also promoted from guest stars to series regulars were Doug Savant and Richard Burgi, who portrayed Tom Scavo and Karl Mayer, respectively.

Receiving "also starring" billing were Shawn Pyfrom, portraying Bree's homosexual son Andrew Van de Kamp, Joy Lauren in the role of Danielle Van de Kamp, Bree's irresponsible and rebel daughter, Mehcad Brooks, portraying Matthew Applewhite, Betty's son who begins a relationship with Danielle, and Brent Kinsman, Shane Kinsman and Zane Huett, playing Preston Scavo, Porter Scavo and Parker Scavo, Lynette's troublesome children. Also receiving an "also starring" billing was Roger Bart, who portrayed George Williams for nine episodes until his character's suicide. Page Kennedy originated the role of Caleb Applewhite, Betty's troubled son, until his replacement with NaShawn Kearse.

Numerous characters have been given expansive arcs in the progressive story line of the season. Kathryn Joosten portrayed Karen McCluskey, one of the most prominent residents of Wisteria Lane who mainly develops in Lynette's story line, whereas Pat Crawford Brown appeared as elderly neighbor Ida Greenberg. Part of Susan's storyline were Lesley Ann Warren returning as Sophie Bremmer, Susan's dramatic mother, Jay Harrington portraying Ron McCready, a doctor and Susan's boyfriend in the second half of the season, Paul Dooley appearing as Addison Prudy, Susan's real father, and Joyce Van Patten playing Carol Prudy, Addison's wife. Part of Lynette's storyline were Currie Graham and Joely Fisher in the roles of Ed Ferrara and Nina Fletcher, who are introduced as Lynette's superiors at the advertising firm she has started working for, and Kiersten Warren appearing as Nora Huntington in the season finale, before her character began being developed for a season three arc. Part of Bree's storyline were Shirley Knight playing Phyllis Van de Kamp, Rex's mother, Dakin Matthews in the role of Reverend Sykes, reverend at the local Presbyterian church, Sam Lloyd portraying Albert Goldfine, Bree's therapist, Ryan Carnes appearing as Justin, Andrew's lover, Bruce Jarchow playing Sam Bormanis, Andrew's lawyer whom he gets to emancipate him, Lee Tergesen in the role of Peter McMillan, Bree's AA sponsor, and former series regular Steven Culp returning in the season finale as Rex Van de Kamp, Bree's now deceased husband.

Part of Gabrielle's storyline were Jesse Metcalfe appearing in a guest star capacity as John Rowland, Gabrielle's former gardener with whom she had an affair, Adrian Pasdar portraying David Bradley, a sleazy lawyer that Gabrielle hires to get Carlos out of jail, Jeff Doucette in the role of Father Crowley, priest at the local Catholic church, Melinda Page Hamilton portraying Sister Mary Bernard, a nun trying to pursue Carlos, Nichole Hiltz and Eddie McClintock respectively playing Libby Collins and Frank Helm, parents of Gabrielle's temporary foster baby, John Kapelos acting as Eugene Beale, owner of an adoption agency, and Gwendoline Yeo appearing as Xiao-Mei, a Chinese woman that is impregnated with Gabrielle's child and begins an affair with Carlos. Part of Mary Alice's storyline were Harriet Sansom Harris returning as Felicia Tilman, who is planning to avenge the death of her sister Martha Huber, and Bob Gunton portraying Noah Taylor, Zach's biological grandfather. Orson Hodge, portrayed by future series regular Kyle MacLachlan, is introduced close to the end of the season, but is initially conceived as a love interest for Susan, before being rewritten as part of Bree's story line.

Reception

Critical response 

Many critics agreed that the series suffered a sophomore slump and that the second season failed to live up to the first. Henry Goldblatt of Entertainment Weekly gave the new season a "B", blaming the deteriorating quality on the fact that it "morphed into four series," with "the actresses wandering through their separate scenes." Robert Bianco of USA Today suggested that the series' weakness was due to Marc Cherry leaving the episodic screenwriting to other writing staff members. Variety Brian Lowry gave the season premiere a positive review, opining that the Lynette storyline looked "extremely promising" and enjoyed the addition of Joely Fisher to the cast as Lynette's "tight-assed new boss." He identified the Bree storyline as "the real water-cooler sequence" and complimented Marcia Cross' performance. However, Lowry criticized the Gabrielle and Susan storylines, opining that they are "exhibiting signs of wear and tear." Michael Slezak of Entertainment Weekly noted that "Next" had "a particularly sleepy opening twenty minutes" while its exciting plot points all occurred in the second half of the episode. He praised the scene in which Bree changes the tie on Rex's corpse and called Cross' performance throughout the episode "pitch-perfect." Slezak also complimented Huffman's performance, but wondered if Fisher was "a steely enough an actress to go Manolo-a-Manolo with Huffman every week."

Though he criticized the repetitive nature of the Susan and Gabrielle storylines, Slezak thought that the Applewhite mystery would help reduce the show's chances of falling into a sophomore slump. He praised Woodward's acting as well as her character's storyline, opining, "there's something so inherently warm and maternal in Woodard's performance, such apple-pie wholesomeness, that it makes her touches of menace all the more chilling." Gael Fashingbauer Cooper of MSNBC complimented that Applewhite storyline, writing: "Forget Lynette's career stress, Gabrielle's baby daddy drama, and even Bree's new widowhood: This story has legs, and apparently arms." She found it strange that the Bree, Andrew, and Danielle characters showed little emotion in regards to Rex's death. Additionally, she noted that the Lynette and Gabrielle storylines provided comic relief while Susan, a character "so often saddled with the comic relief of the show, had a sad and serious premiere." Sarah Gilbert of TV Squad gave the episode a positive review, stating the episode delivered "lots of juicy resolution, several power suits, and, you guessed it, lots of tears and shouting." Aaron Wallace of Ultimate Disney notes Susan's decreasing importance throughout the season, pointing out Bree, who "comfortably moves into position as the show's lead". Also in response to Susan's storyline, many critics saw the character suffer as a result of the declining quality of the second season. Robert Bianco of USA Today wrote that the writers were making her look "too stupid".

Awards and nominations 

The season, cast and crew received critical acclaim and numerous awards and nominations. The 58th Primetime Emmy Awards saw the series receive seven nominations, out of which five were for the production team. The series was nominated for both Outstanding Single-Camera Picture Editing for a Comedy Series and for Outstanding Hairstyling for a Series, as well as for Outstanding Costumes for a Series, Outstanding Casting for a Comedy Series and Outstanding Art Direction for a Single-Camera Series. Alfre Woodard's portrayal of Betty Applewhite was praised and resulted in a nomination for Outstanding Supporting Actress in a Comedy Series, whereas Shirley Knight's guest appearance in the role of Phyllis Van de Kamp got her a nomination in the Outstanding Guest Actress in a Comedy Series category. At the 63rd Golden Globe Awards, the series was named the Best Musical or Comedy Series, while each of the four main actresses received a nomination for their portrayals of the protagonists, but all lost to Weeds Mary-Louise Parker.

At the 64th Golden Globe Awards, however, the series only received a nomination for Best Musical or Comedy Series, seeing Cross and Huffman nominated for their respective roles. The fifth episode of the season received a nomination at the 2006 Art Directors Guild for the Best Single-Camera Television Series category, while the Casting Society of America nominated Junie Lowry-Johnson and Scott Genkinger for Best Comedy Episodic Casting, following their being awarded at the previous year's ceremony. The Costume Designer's Guild Awards praised the costumes used on-set, and nominated the series for Excellence for Costume Design for Television. The 18th Gay and Lesbian Alliance Against Defamation Media Awards nominated the series for Outstanding Comedy Series, while Mehcad Brooks individual performance of Matthew Applewhite was nominated at the 2005 National Association for the Advancement of Colored People Image Awards. The 2006 ceremony of the Monte Carlo Television Festival saw the series being awarded for the first time as the Best Comedy Series, before winning the same award for another five years in a row. The series was nominated for Most Popular Drama at the 2006 National Television Awards, following the nomination for the series in the Favorite Television Comedy at the 2006 People's Choice Awards, which also saw Teri Hatcher getting a nomination for her performance in the role of Susan Mayer. Felicity Huffman's portrayal of Lynette Scavo earned her an award for Outstanding Actress in a Comedy Series at the 2005 Screen Actors Guild Awards, whereas at the 2006 ceremony, the series received a nomination for Outstanding Cast in a Comedy Series and a nomination in the Outstanding Actress in a Comedy Series category for Huffman.

At the 2006 Teen Choice Awards, both Eva Longoria and Teri Hatcher were nominated for Choice Television Comedy Actress, whereas Jesse Metcalfe's guest appearances in the role of John Rowland earned him a nomination for Choice Television Comedy Actor, which was eventually won by James Denton, for his portrayal of Mike Delfino. The writing of "Next", the season premiere, resulted in the production team receiving a nomination for Best Writing in an Episodic Comedy at the 2005 Writers Guild of America Awards, while the 2006 ceremony saw the writing staff nominated in the same category for "Don't Look at Me". The series received three nominations at the 2005 ceremony of Young Artist Awards, where Andrea Bowen was nominated for Best Leading Young Actress in a Comedy or Drama Television Series, and Cody Kasch for Best Supporting Young Actor in a Comedy or Drama Television Series. Zane Huett, however, was the only cast member awarded at the ceremony, in the Best Young Actor Age Ten or Younger in a Comedy or Drama Television Series category.

Ratings 

The American Broadcasting Company kept Desperate Housewives original time slot, airing the series on Sunday nights at 9:00 ET. The series continued to air as a lead-in to fellow ABC series Grey's Anatomy, then in its second season, which took over Boston Legal time slot after airing nine episodes in the 2004-05 prime time television season. The show minatained its position as a top ten series and became the fourth most-watched program for 2005-06 American television season, with an average of 21.70 million viewers, out of whom 10.09 million in the 18-49 age group. ABC had three top 20 shows on the Sunday Night lineup, seeing Desperate Housewives ranked fourth, along with the other two shows, ranking fifth and nineteenth. The ninth and tenth episodes ranked first in weekly viewership.

The highest-rated episode of the season was the season premiere, with 28.36 million viewers tuning in and 10.1 rating, ranking second in the week after the sixth-season premiere of CBS's CSI: Crime Scene Investigation, which was watched by 29.02 million viewers and received a 10.3 rating. The episode, which is the second highest-rated episode of the series, attracted a larger audience compared to the previous season premiere, which received a 7.8 rating and was watched by 21.64 million viewers, almost seven less million viewers than "Next". Although the episode attracted less viewers than CSI, it outperformed both Lost and Grey's Anatomy, one of the most successful series of the season. The lowest-rated episode was the nineteenth, watched by 20.02 million viewers with a 7.1 rating and #5 ranking, being the first to be outperformed by Fox Broadcasting Company's House, which attracted 21.20 million viewers and received a 7.6 rating. The season finale was watched by 24.23 million viewers, scoring an 8.6 rating and #4 ranking. There was a significant decrease in the number of viewers, compared to "One Wonderful Day", the previous season finale, which was the highest-rated episode of the series, attracting almost six more million viewers with an 11.0 rating.

Episodes

DVD release

Notes

References

External links

 
2005 American television seasons
2006 American television seasons